"I Believe in Music" is a 1970 song written and recorded by Mac Davis and later included on his second album I Believe in Music. Gallery covered it in 1972 as the second of three singles off their Nice to Be with You album and the follow-up release to their title track.

Gallery's version reached #22 on the US Billboard Hot 100 and #13 on the US Cash Box Top 100. It hit #5 in Canada.

Mac Davis's original had been released as a single nearly two years earlier and made a minor dent in the pop charts (US #117). His effort achieved #25 on the Adult Contemporary chart. It later became his signature song and an iconic anthem of the early '70s.

Inspiration

In a 2017 interview, Davis said the song was inspired while he was in England at the home of Lulu and Maurice Gibb, who were married at that time: 

Davis said he kept and framed the piece of paper from the hotel room where he completed the song. According to him, the line "Lift your voices to the sky, God loves you when you sing" was inspired by a piece of folk art he had seen that said, "God respects you when you work, but He loves you when you sing".

Chart performance

Weekly charts

Year-end charts

Mac Davis original

Marian Love cover

Gallery cover

Other cover versions
Helen Reddy's version was the first commercial recording of the song, and it was featured as the B-side of her first American success, "I Don't Know How to Love Him," which became a hit in February 1971.  "I Believe in Music" has also been covered by Marian Love (#111, 1971; AC #27), Donny Hathaway, B.J. Thomas, Liza Minnelli, Perry Como, Louis Jordan, Lee Towers, Wayne Newton, Kenny Rogers, Glen Campbell and The Statler Brothers.

References

External links
 
 

1970 songs
1970 singles
1971 singles
1972 singles
Columbia Records singles
Sussex Records singles
Songs written by Mac Davis
Songs about music
Mac Davis songs
Gallery (band) songs
B. J. Thomas songs
Helen Reddy songs